Wrestling is one of the oldest sports in India. Several regional styles and variations in folk wrestling exists in the country. Indian wrestlers have won numerous medals at international competitions in freestyle wrestling.

History
Wrestling has been popular in India since ancient times, it was mainly an exercise to stay physically fit. The wrestlers, traditionally, use to wear a loincloth, langota. In Ancient India wrestling was most famously known as Malla-yuddha. One of the premier characters in Mahabharata, Bhima was considered to be a great wrestler of the time, and some of the other great wrestlers included Karna, Jarasandha, Keechaka and Balrama. In the other Indian epic, Ramayana also mentions wrestling in India and Hanuman is described as one of the greatest wrestlers of his time.

During the Mughal rule who were of Turko-Mongol descent, the influence of Iranian and Mongolian wrestling were incorporated to the local Malla-yuddha to form the modern Pehlwani.

Wrestling in India is also known as Dangal, and it is the basic form of a wrestling tournament. It is also called kushti in Punjab and Haryana. The wrestling in Punjab and Haryana will take place in a circular court with soft ground which in Punjabi is called an "akharha". Two wrestlers will continue to wrestle until the back of one touches the ground. The winner will parade the court with the loser following him.[10] The wrestlers are called Pehlwans who train with modern weights and traditional weights such as a Gada (mace). The aim of kushti is to wrestle the opponent and to block the other player.

Regional variants

 Gatta gusthi, a submission wrestling style common in Kerala.
 Inbuan, a traditional folk wrestling style native to Mizoram.
 Kabaddi, a form of South Asian folk wrestling played in teams.
 Kene, a traditional folk wrestling style native to Nagaland.
 Malakhra, a wrestling common in Sindh (Pakistan) and Gujarat.
 Malla-yuddha, oldest traditional wrestling extant in India.
 Malyutham, a folk wrestling style native to Tamil Nadu. 
 Mukna, a form of folk wrestling native to Manipur.
 Pehlwani or Kushti, a Mughal style of wrestling common in North India.
 Vajra-mushti, a folk wrestling form which employs a fist-load weapon.

Tournament records

Notable performances at Summer Olympics

See also
 Akhara
 Musti-yuddha, India's oldest form of boxing.

References

Further reading
 Rudraneil Sengupta, 2016, Enter the Dangal: Travels through India's Wrestling Landscape.
 Joseph S. Alter, 1992, The Wrestler's Body: Identity and Ideology in North India.
 Saurabh Duggal, 2017, Akhada: The Authorized Biography of Mahavir Singh Phogat.

External links
 

Wrestling in India